Vavasseur mountings were several mounting devices for artillery and machine guns. They were invented and patented by Josiah Vavasseur.

The mountings were used in Barton's Point Battery in Sheerness, on the Isle of Sheppey, in Kent, England.

Vavasseur pivot mountings were also used in naval artillery mounted on ships in the late 19th century.

References

Patents

External links

Machine guns
Machine guns of the United States
Weapon fixtures